In chemistry, the capped square antiprismatic molecular geometry describes the shape of compounds where nine atoms, groups of atoms, or ligands are arranged around a central atom, defining the vertices of a gyroelongated square pyramid.

The gyroelongated square pyramid is a square pyramid with a square antiprism connected to the square base. In this respect, it can be seen as a "capped" square antiprism (a square antiprism with a pyramid erected on one of the square faces).

It is very similar to the tricapped trigonal prismatic molecular geometry, and there is some dispute over the specific geometry exhibited by certain molecules.

Examples
 is sometimes described as having a capped square antiprismatic geometry, although its geometry is most often described as tricapped trigonal prismatic.
, a lanthanum(III) complex with a La–La bond.

References

Stereochemistry
Molecular geometry